A76 or A-76 may refer to:

 A76 motorway (Netherlands)
 A76 road, a road in Scotland
 A76 highway (Afghanistan), a road connecting Kabul and Mazar-i-Sharif
 Autovía A-76, a Spanish motorway
 Benoni Defense, in the Encyclopaedia of Chess Openings
 Button battery type LR1154 by the IEC standard
 Iceberg A-76, calved from the Filchner–Ronne Ice Shelf of Antarctica in May 2021
 ARM Cortex-A76, a computer processor microarchitecture